Badarnegan (also Romanized as Bādarnegān) is a village in Qaleh Tall Rural District, in the Central District of Bagh-e Malek County, Khuzestan Province, Iran. At the 2006 census, its population was 414, in 70 families.

References 

Populated places in Bagh-e Malek County